Galaosiyo (also Gala Osiyo) is a city and seat of Bukhara District in Bukhara Region in Uzbekistan. Its population is 12,600 (2016).

References

Populated places in Bukhara Region
Cities in Uzbekistan